Valérie Hénin French boxer, kickboxer and Muay Thai fighter. She is a former ISKA World Kickboxing champion and the former WIBF Welterweight boxing champion.

Boxing

On Valerie Henin boxing debut she fought Mary Ann Almager in order to become a WIBF world Welterweight champion.

On June 16 2001, Henin fought Patricia Demick in Anchorage, Alaska, for the WIBF world Welterweight title.  The fight ended in a draw.

Personal life

Valerie Henin was married to kickboxer Orlando Wiet and had a daughter called Magda Wiet-Hénin a taekwondo Olympian.

Championships and accomplishments 
 1994 ISKA World Kickboxing Champion 
 1996 WIBF world Welterweight title
 2000 European Taekwondo Championships bronze medal

Professional boxing record

References

External links
 

1967 births
French female taekwondo practitioners
People from Nancy, France
French Muay Thai practitioners
Female Muay Thai practitioners
French female kickboxers
Lightweight kickboxers
French women boxers
Welterweight boxers
French savateurs
International Boxing Federation champions
French female mixed martial artists
Living people